Malti Rai is an Indian teacher and politician who is serving as Mayor of Bhopal and President of Bharatiya Janata Party of Bhopal. She was nominated for Mayor of Bhopal by Bharatiya Janata Party. She is the first lady mayor of Bhopal.

Personal life 
She was born in Bina. In 1980, She married Munnalal Rai who was a farmer. She also served as Councillor of Ashoka Garden, Bhopal from 2004 to 2009. In July 2022, She became First Citizen of Bhopal.

References 

Living people
21st-century Indian politicians
People from Madhya Pradesh
Women mayors of places in India
Year of birth missing (living people)
21st-century Indian women politicians